Solange Ancona (born 14 August 1943 in Paris) is a French composer.

Ancona studied at the Conservatoire National Superieur de Paris under Olivier Messiaen and Giacinto Scelsi. She resided at the Villa Medici between 1973 and 1975.

After completing her studies, Ancona took a position teaching musical analysis and composition at the Conservatoire Régional de Versailles, where she remained for over thirty years. Noted students include French composer François Paris, cellist Florian Lauridon and French composer and pianist Benoît Delbecq.

Works
Selected works include:
 Slantze III for soprano and orchestra (text by Dante)
 Thama for solo cello (created by Florian Lauridon)
 Resonanz classical guitar 10-string (created by Sebastian Vaumoron)
 Aïvantcha musical theater (text by Dante)
 Fidélité, inspired by a poem by Louis Valensi

Discography
Releases:
 Snaïa/Proslambanomenos/Anschlag/Sonate Pour Flutes Alto Et Harpes (LP) Point-Radiant 1971
 La Journée De L'Existence (CD, Album)

References

1943 births
20th-century classical composers
21st-century classical composers
French classical composers
French women classical composers
French music educators
Living people
20th-century French women musicians
20th-century French composers
21st-century French composers
21st-century French women musicians
Women music educators
20th-century women composers
21st-century women composers